Pat Mendonca is an Indian athlete. She won a Silver medal in the 4 × 100 m relay at the 1951 Asian Games along with Roshan Mistry, Banoo Gulzar and her cousin Mary D'Souza.

References

Athletes (track and field) at the 1951 Asian Games
Indian female sprinters
Asian Games silver medalists for India
Asian Games medalists in athletics (track and field)
Medalists at the 1951 Asian Games
Possibly living people
Year of birth missing